Spanish Governors of New Mexico were the political chief executives of the province of Santa Fe de Nuevo México (New Mexico) between 1598, when it was established by an expedition by Juan de Oñate, and 1822, following Mexico's declaration of independence. New Mexico became a territory of the United States beginning in 1846, and a state in 1912.

History
In 1598, Juan de Oñate pioneered 'The Royal Road of the Interior Land', or El Camino Real de Tierra Adentro, between Mexico City and the Tewa village of 'Ohkay Owingeh', or San Juan Pueblo, founding the Nuevo México Province under the authority of Philip II. He also founded the settlement (a Spanish pueblo) of San Juan on the Rio Grande near the Native American Pueblo. In 1610, Pedro de Peralta, then governor, established the settlement of Santa Fe in the region of the Sangre de Cristo Mountains on the Rio Grande. Missions were established for conversions and agricultural industry under the authority of the governor. The territory's Puebloan peoples resented  the Spaniards denigration and prohibition of their traditional religion, and their encomienda system's forced labor. In 1680, the Pueblo Revolt occurred, and a final resolution included additional protections from Spanish efforts to eradicate their culture and religion, the issuing of substantial communal land grants to each Pueblo, and a public defender of their rights and for their legal cases in Spanish courts.

In January 1822, the last Governor under the Spanish regime, Facundo Melgares, lost the title of governor and was now called géfe político (political chief) and géfe militar (military chief). Subsequently, Melgares became the first Mexican Governor of New Mexico, serving until July 5, 1822 when he was succeeded by Francisco Xavier Chavez, though he would hold office for just five months.

Governors
The following is a list of governors of the Province of New Mexico under the Viceroyalty of New Spain:

1st stage  (1598–1680)
The political chiefs (géfe políticos) or governors were:

2nd stage: Governors and Pueblo leaders during the revolt 
From 1680 until 1692, the Puebloans revolted against Spanish domination and lived under their own rulers.
The political chiefs or governors and Pueblo leaders were:

3rd stage  (1688–1822)
The political chiefs (géfe políticos) or governors were:

See also

History of New Mexico
List of Mexican governors of New Mexico (1822–1846)
List of U.S. governors of New Mexico (1846–present)

References

 
.
New Mexico
New Mexico
New Mexico governors
New Mexico
Governors
New Mexico
New Mexico-related lists